Mohamed Ramadan (born 4 April 1991) is a professional footballer who plays as a striker for Swedish club Heleneholms SK. Born in Sweden, Ramadan is of Lebanese descent and holds dual-citizenship. He represented Lebanon internationally once, in 2015.

Club career
As a youngster, Ramadan played for Kvarnby IK until he joined Helsingborgs IF in July 2010. On 9 May 2011, he made his debut against Gefle IF coming off the bench in the 86th minute. He made his first continental appearance in a UEFA Europa League play-off game against Standard Liège in 2011. While at Helsingborg, Ramadan was loaned out to Ängelholms FF, Trelleborgs FF and HIF Akademi.

In early 2014, he signed for the Division 3 club IFK Malmö. He scored 22 goals in 20 games, which contributed greatly to IFK Malmö winning the 2014 Division 3 Södra. In February 2015, Ramadan returned to Helsingborg. In August 2015, he was loaned out to Division 1 club Landskrona BoIS.

In November 2015, Ramadan signed for FC Rosengård in the Division 2 Södra. In August 2017, Ramadan returned to Division 2 club IFK Malmö.  In December 2019, Ramadan moved to Rosengård FF. Prior to the 2021 season, Ramadan joined Heleneholms SK.

International career
Ramadan got called up for the Lebanon national team against Saudi Arabia on 14 October 2014, but did not play. He later got called up and made his debut in a friendly against Iraq on 26 August 2015. He was unable to further represent the national team due to paperwork problems.

See also
 List of Lebanon international footballers born outside Lebanon

References

External links
 
 
 
 
 
 Mohamed Ramadan at Lagstatistik

1991 births
Living people
Footballers from Malmö
Swedish people of Lebanese descent
Sportspeople of Lebanese descent
Lebanese footballers
Swedish footballers
Association football forwards
Kvarnby IK players
Helsingborgs IF players
Ängelholms FF players
Trelleborgs FF players
HIF Akademi players
IFK Malmö Fotboll players
Landskrona BoIS players
FC Rosengård 1917 players
Division 3 (Swedish football) players
Division 2 (Swedish football) players
Allsvenskan players
Superettan players
Ettan Fotboll players
Lebanon international footballers